Meilichos is a torrent in the northwestern part of Achaea, southern Greece.  The river flows from a spring near Skioessa near the northern part of the Panachaiko mountain west of the ravine of Charadros to the Gulf of Patras. It passes north of Skioessa, under a viaduct of Motorway 5, through the village Sychaina, now a neighbourhood of Patras, it empties west of the neighbourhood of Agyia.

In antiquity there was a temple of Artemis Triklaria near the river, but this has not yet been found by archaeologists. Near the intersection of present-day Aretha Street and the Greek National Road 8A in the Patras neighbourhood of Ampelokipoi, a bridge from the Roman era has been excavated. It currently has a covering which protects the structure from rain.

References

Landforms of Achaea
Geography of Patras
Rivers of Western Greece
Drainage basins of the Ionian Sea
Rivers of Greece